The Mix is Monchy & Alexandra's first remix released album under the Sony International label. The album was released on June 10, 2003. The album contains music previously released by the artistic duo. The songs however have been mixed to fit other Latino musical genres, such as reggaeton, as well as European musical genres as techno.

Track listing

Charts

References

 

2003 remix albums
Monchy & Alexandra remix albums
Spanish-language remix albums